Yevheniy Kostyantynovych Shevchenko (born 2 December 1995) is a Ukrainian professional footballer who plays as a left back for Ukrainian club VPK-Ahro Shevchenkivka.

References

External links
 Profile on VPK-Ahro Shevchenkivka official website
 

1995 births
Living people
People from Brovary
Ukrainian footballers
Association football defenders
FC Metalurh Donetsk players
FC Lokomotyv Kyiv players
FC Obolon-Brovar Kyiv players
FC Obolon-2 Kyiv players
FC Polissya Zhytomyr players
FC VPK-Ahro Shevchenkivka players
Ukrainian First League players
Ukrainian Second League players
Sportspeople from Kyiv Oblast